Lismore Turf Club is a horse racing venue in Lismore, New South Wales, Australia.

The racecourse holds numerous Thoroughbred racehorse meetings each year. The feature event is the annual Lismore Cup, which is held on the last Thursday of September.

The grass track can hold various distances up to 2100m. The ground has a large members stand, and grassed areas to view the track from. Most meetings held at the track have full TAB coverage, with on-site bookmakers and totalisator facilities available.

A function centre on-site often holds events such as parties, weddings and business meetings.

References

Further reading
 Lismore Turf Club is gearing up
 Big crowd tipped for Lismore Cup
 Lismore Turf Club boosts security after horse poisonings
 NSW Animal Liberation targets Lismore rodeo

Horse racing venues in Australia
Sports venues in New South Wales
Lismore, New South Wales
Horse racing organisations in Australia